The smallscale yellowfish (Labeobarbus polylepis) is a South African species of freshwater fish in  the cyprinid family. It is native to the Limpopo, Incomati and Pongolo drainages.

References 

Labeobarbus
Taxa named by George Albert Boulenger
Fish described in 1907